Mitchell Highway is an outback state highway located in the central and south western regions of Queensland and the northern and central western regions of New South Wales in Australia. The southern part of Mitchell Highway forms part of the National Highway A32 corridor, which stretches from Sydney to Adelaide via Dubbo and Broken Hill. The highway is a part of route Alternative A2 between Augathella and Charleville, route A71 and B71 between Charleville and Nyngan, and part of route A32 between Nyngan and Bathurst.

In New South Wales, the highway's south-eastern terminus is at its junction with Great Western and Mid-Western Highways, and it links with Golden, Newell, Oxley, Barrier and Kamilaroi Highways. In Queensland, the highway links with Balonne and Warrego Highways and its northern terminus is at its junction with Landsborough Highway.

Route
Mitchell Highway lies west of the Great Dividing Range and in New South Wales runs generally northwest–southeast and in Queensland, runs generally north–south in the central western and southwest parts of that state.

From its northern terminus at a junction with the Landsborough Highway near Augathella, Mitchell Highway heads south as route Alternative A2 through Charleville, meeting Warrego Highway heading east as Alternative A2. From this point Mitchell Highway generally heads southeast through to Nyngan, meeting with Barrier Highway, and continues south as route A32. At  the highway meets Oxley Highway, before passing through  and then heads generally east to the major rural centre of Dubbo, where it meets Newell Highway, before it crosses the Macquarie River and heads south towards , crossing the Macquarie River again. At , the highway generally starts to head east towards , where an alternative route diverts many heavy vehicles away from the city centre; the portion of Mitchell Highway that passes through Orange city centre is known locally as Summer Street.

History
The passing of the Main Roads Act of 1924 through the Parliament of New South Wales provided for the declaration of Main Roads, roads partially funded by the State government through the Main Roads Board (later the Department of Main Roads, and eventually Transport for NSW). North-Western Highway was declared (as Main Road No. 7) on 8 August 1928, from the interchange with Great Western Highway and Mid-Western Highway in Bathurst, via Orange, Dubbo, Nyngan, and Bourke, to the border with Queensland; with the passing of the Main Roads (Amendment) Act of 1929 to provide for additional declarations of State Highways and Trunk Roads, this was amended to State Highway 7 on 8 April 1929. On 9 October 1936 the name was changed to Mitchell Highway, in honour of Lieutenant Colonel Sir Thomas Mitchell, who was Surveyor-General of New South Wales in the 1820s and explored much of inland New South Wales, Victoria and Queensland.

The passing of the Roads Act of 1993 updated road classifications and the way they could be declared within New South Wales. Under this act, Mitchell Highway today retains its declaration as Highway 7, from the state border with Queensland at Barringun to the intersection with Great Western and Mid-Western Highways at Bathurst.

Mitchel Highway was signed National Route 71 between Augathella and Nygan, and National Route 32 between Nyngan and Bathurst, in 1955. With both states' conversion to their newer alphanumeric systems in 2004 and 2013, its former route numbers were updated to Alternative A2 between Augathella and Charleville and A71 between Charleville and the state border within Queensland in 2004, and B71 between the state border and Nyngan and A32 between Nyngan and Bathurst within New South Wales in 2013.

Truck explosion
On 5 September 2014, a truck travelling on Mitchell Highway rolled off a road bridge at Angellala Creek approximately 30 km south of Charleville. The truck was carrying 52 tonnes of ammonium nitrate which exploded. The blast destroyed the two road bridges and severely damaged the adjacent rail bridge. The blast was so powerful that the truck was disintegrated and the dangers posed by the remaining ammonium nitrate necessitated a 2 km exclusion zone around the site for a number of days. The large crater formed by the blast closed the highway necessitating detours of up to 600 km. The Department of Transport and Mains Road was allowed to commence work at the site on 13 September and by 23 September had constructed a temporary side track around the blast site suitable for cars, buses and light trucks. By 7 October, the side track had been upgraded to support road trains, ending the need to detour. In April 2015, the $10 million tender to reconstruct the highway and bridges were awarded and the construction work took place between June and November 2015. In early 2016, a competition was held to decide a new name for the bridge.

Major intersections

See also

 Highways in Australia
 Highways in New South Wales
 List of highways in Queensland

References

External links

Highways in Australia
Highways in New South Wales
Highways in Queensland
Far West (New South Wales)
Central West (New South Wales)
Central West Queensland
South West Queensland
City of Orange